Patrick Possum Gorman (born 12 December 1984) is an Australian politician, elected as an Australian Labor Party representative to the Division of Perth at the 2018 Perth by-election.

Early life
Gorman was born on 12 December 1984 in East Fremantle, Western Australia. His parents are Wendy and Ron Gorman, who were both teachers. Gorman has a younger brother. He attended Lance Holt School, a small independent primary school in Fremantle, and Melville Senior High School. He then completed a Bachelor of Social Science at Curtin University, and a Graduate Diploma of Business and a Master of Business Administration at the University of Western Australia.

Early career
From 2006 to 2007, Gorman worked as a research officer for Ken Travers, a member of the Western Australian Legislative Council, and from 2008 to 2009, Gorman worked as an electorate officer for Melissa Parke, a member of the Australian House of Representatives. During this time, he held several voluntary positions in the Labor Party: from 2006 to 2008, he was secretary of the Australian Labor Party Curtin University sub-branch; from 2007 to 2008, he was Secretary of Young Labor (WA); and in 2009, he was convenor of the Australian Labor Party Conservation, Environment and Climate Change Policy Committee (WA).

From 2010 to 2013, Gorman worked in various advisor positions for Kevin Rudd, including as principal advisor during Rudd's second term as prime minister. In 2014 and 2015, Gorman worked as Director of Public Affairs for the United Voice union, which is part of the Labor Left faction.

In 2015, Gorman replaced Simon Mead as the State Secretary of WA Labor, with the backing of United Voice. Mead had resigned after losing support from WA Labor leader Mark McGowan, and United Voice. As secretary, Gorman led the 2017 Western Australian state election campaign for Labor, where McGowan became Premier of Western Australia.

In parliament
In May 2018, Gorman was selected as the Labor Party's candidate for the division of Perth at the 2018 Perth by-election. This came after first-term MP Tim Hammond resigned from parliament, citing that he wanted to spend more time with his family. The Liberal Party declined to contest the election. The by-election was held on 28 July, the same day as 4 other by-elections. Gorman won with a primary vote of 38.5%, and a two-party-preferred vote of 63.1% against the Greens.

Gorman retained his seat at the 2019 Australian federal election.

In a January 2021 shadow cabinet reshuffle, Gorman became Shadow Assistant Minister for Western Australia.

In October 2021, Gorman announced his support for changing the date of Australia Day, having previously been against the idea. In addition to the day's negative impact on indigenous people, he said that Australia Day is "not a date that means much to what became Western Australia". He also said he was wrong not to previously support changing the date.

Personal life
Gorman is married to Jess Bukowski. They have two kids.

References

1984 births
Living people
Members of the Australian House of Representatives for Perth
21st-century Australian politicians
Australian Labor Party members of the Parliament of Australia
Labor Left politicians
People from Fremantle